is a passenger railway station located in the city of Matsuyama, Ehime Prefecture, Japan. It is operated by the private transportation company Iyotetsu.

Lines
During most of the day, trains arrive every fifteen minutes. Trains continue from Matsuyama City Station on the Takahama Line to Takahama Station.

Layout
The station consists of one side platform serving a single bi-directional track. The station is unattended. It is located on the bridge over the Ishite River. The railway bridge that supports the station was built in 1893 and is the oldest railway bridge in Japan that has not been relocated.

History
Ishitegawa Park Station was opened on 14 June 1972.

Surrounding area
Ishite River
Ishitegawa Park
Matsuyama Nursing College

See also
 List of railway stations in Japan

References

External links

Iyotetsu Station Information

Iyotetsu Yokogawara Line
Railway stations in Ehime Prefecture
Railway stations in Japan opened in 1972
Railway stations in Matsuyama, Ehime